is a railway station in Nōgata, Fukuoka Prefecture, Japan. It is on the Ita Line, operated by the Heisei Chikuhō Railway. Trains arrive roughly every 30 minutes.

On 1 April 2009, an Osaka-based interior design firm, Osaka Sun News, acquired naming rights to the station.

Platforms

External links
Nakaizumi Station (Heisei Chikuhō Railway website)

References

Railway stations in Fukuoka Prefecture
Railway stations in Japan opened in 1898
Heisei Chikuhō Railway Ita Line